Robo-Sapiens is the debut album by Malibu, the electronica/remix project of Roger Joseph Manning Jr., released in Japan only on April 18, 2007 by Pony Canyon. The album was subsequently released outside Japan with a revised track listing on November 5, 2007 by Expansion Team Records.

The album includes the TV Eyes track "She Gets Around", which was originally released as the B-side of the "She's a Study" 12-inch single in 2003.

Track listing

Japanese release (CD)
All songs written by Roger Joseph Manning Jr., except where noted.
"Yesteryear" – 5:37
"Please Don't Go" – 4:20
"The Bounce" – 6:22
"German Oil" – 6:19
"Animal Lovin' Ken" – 6:12
"Parisian Nights" – 5:10
"Sidekicks" – 7:16
"Rubber Tubes" – 5:35
"She Gets Around" (Jason Falkner/Manning Jr./Brian Reitzell) – 6:25
"D.I.E.T." – 6:34
"Time to Time" – 5:06
"Whips & Chains on the Astral Plane" – 7:15 (bonus track)

Worldwide release (CD)
All songs written by Roger Joseph Manning Jr., except where noted.
"Yesteryear" – 5:34
"The Bounce" – 6:19
"German Oil" – 6:19
"Sidekicks" – 7:13
"She Gets Around" (Jason Falkner/Manning Jr./Brian Reitzell) – 6:21
"Rubber Tubes" – 5:33
"Parisian Nights" – 5:09
"Animal Lovin' Ken" – 6:12
"Time to Time" – 5:05
"D.I.E.T." – 6:31
"Please Don't Go" - 4:20

Personnel
Musicians
Malibu - all sounds
Jason Falkner - additional guitar and keyboard
Brian Reitzell - additional percussive programming

Production
Mixing and masterering by John Paterno
Recorded at Stu-Stu-Studio
Artwork and design: Adaptor
Synthesizer restoration: Kevin Lightner and Ed Miller

2007 albums
Roger Joseph Manning Jr. albums
Pony Canyon albums